The 2002 Big 12 Conference women's basketball tournament was held March 5–9, 2002, at Municipal Auditorium in Kansas City, MO.

Number 1 seed  defeated number 2 seed  84–69 to win their first championship and receive the conference's automatic bid to the 2002 NCAA tournament.

Seeding
The Tournament consisted of a 12 team single-elimination tournament with the top 4 seeds receiving a bye.

Schedule

Tournament

All-Tournament team
Most Outstanding Player – Stacey Dales, Oklahoma

See also
2002 Big 12 Conference men's basketball tournament
2002 NCAA Division I women's basketball tournament
2001–02 NCAA Division I women's basketball rankings

References

Big 12 Conference women's basketball tournament
Tournament
Big 12 Conference women's basketball tournament
Big 12 Conference women's basketball tournament